A Geographic targeting order (or GTO) is an order issued by the United States Secretary of Treasury requiring any United States domestic financial institutions that exist within a geographic area to report on transactions any greater than a specified value. They only last for a limited period of time — originally each order lasted 60 days however section 353 of the USA PATRIOT Act extended such orders to 180 days.

External links
 Title 31, Subtitle IV, Chapter 53, § 5326 - Records of certain domestic coin and currency transactions

United States Department of the Treasury